No Mercy is a trio of American singers who were originally brought together in Germany by producer Frank Farian. The group consists of Bronx-born Marty Cintron and twin brothers Ariel and Gabriel Hernández, who hailed from Miami.

Career

1995–1997: My Promise
In 1995 the group released their single "Missing" which was a cover version of Everything but the Girl's 1994 hit. No Mercy released their debut album My Promise on October 21, 1996. My Promise was the original title chosen by the trio's German record company, Hansa, BMG. The album was released in the U.S. only a week later under the self title No Mercy on October 29, 1996. The album, however, was released in most areas of the world with its original title My Promise, including Australia where it received two times platinum sales accreditation. My Promise which became a top-5 album in countries like Austria, Belgium, the Netherlands and Switzerland, produced two internationally popular singles, including "Where Do You Go" and "When I Die", the first being a cover of La Bouche's "Where Do You Go" from 1995. This was followed by the single "Please Don't Go", which entered the top 5 in Austria and the U.K. The trio released a re-worked version of the band Exile's number one song from 1978, "Kiss You All Over", which was a moderate success on the charts but still managed to enter the top 20 in Austria, the Netherlands and the UK.

1998–1999: More
No Mercy's second album, More, which was released in Germany on October 12, 1998, included singles such as "Hello How Are You", "More than a Feeling" (originally recorded by Boston) and "Tu Amor" (originally by Jon B., and later covered also by RBD). Although More was not as successful as its predecessor, it still managed to achieve success in the GSA region (Germany, Switzerland, Austria), peaking at No.7, No.9, No.9 respectively.

2000–present: Singles and current status
In 2002, a single, "Don't Let Me Be Misunderstood" featuring guitarist Al Di Meola, was released to gauge support for No Mercy's third album. The record producer decided instead to rework the songs for solo artist Daniel Lopes' debut album, Shine On, in 2003. The band would guest feature in that album, on the track "Summer Angel".

In October 2007, No Mercy released their third album, Day By Day, under a new Australian-based independent record label, Show No Mercy Entertainment Pty Ltd, and via iTunes.

On December 16, 2011 No Mercy released the single "Shed My Skin" featuring Stan Kolev via iTunes.

Guitarist and lead vocalist Marty Cintron performs in Europe under the No Mercy name.

In popular culture
No Mercy's version of the La Bouche song "Where Do You Go"  (Ocean Drive Mix) was featured in the 1998 American comedy film A Night at the Roxbury.

A No Mercy song was also used on the ABC-TV series Lois and Clark.

Discography

Studio albums

North American releases

Compilation albums

Singles

See also
List of number-one dance hits (United States)
List of artists who reached number one on the US Dance chart

References

External links
nomercymusic.com Official website 

American dance music groups
American pop music groups
American boy bands
Arista Records artists
American Eurodance groups
Musical groups from Miami
Musical groups established in 1996
Hispanic and Latino American musicians